Allegion plc is an American Irish-domiciled provider of security products for homes and businesses. 

Though it comprises thirty-one global brands, including CISA, Interflex, LCN, Schlage and Von Duprin, the company operates through two main sections: Allegion International and Allegion Americas. The company employs around 12,000 people, sells its products in more than 130 countries across the world and in 2022 generated revenues of US$3.27 billion.

It is part of the S&P 500 and headquartered in Dublin.

History 
Allegion spun off from Ingersoll Rand Plc on 1 December 2013, and became a standalone, publicly traded company. This placed Allegion on the S&P 500, where it replaced JC Penney.

David D. Petratis was announced chairman of the board, chief executive officer and president of the company, in August 2013. As of 2022, John H. Stone became the president and chief executive officer of the company. Petratis remains the chairman of the board until Jan 2, 2023.

Mergers and subsidiaries 

 On 8 January 2014, Allegion acquired certain assets of Schlage Lock de Colombia S.A., the second largest mechanical lock manufacturer in Colombia, with revenues of US$12 million. The acquisition gave Allegion a 45,000 square foot integrated plant in Bogota, Colombia, and approximately 350 new employees.
 On 22 April 2022, Allegion acquired Stanley Access Technologies LLC

Corporate affairs

Management and leadership 
The company is managed by President and CEO, John H. Stone. Prior to his appointment as CEO of Allegion, Stone held the position of President within Deere & Company’s Worldwide Construction, Forestry and Power Systems business.

Stone is responsible for the strategic direction of the company alongside an Executive Team comprising 10 members.

Locations 
Allegion is headquartered in Dublin, Ireland. Its regional offices for the Americas are in Carmel, Indiana, United States. Its European regional offices are in Faenza, Italy, and the company's Asian headquarters are in Tower B of City Center of Shanghai in Shanghai, China. 

Production facilities are located in Colombia, Mexico, Europe, the Middle East, Australasia, the U.S. and New Zealand.

Ownership 
As of 2017, Allegion shares are mainly held by institutional investors (T. Rowe Price, Vanguard Group, JPMorgan Chase and others).

Brands and subsidiaries

 AD Systems 
 Austral Lock
 AXA
 Bricard
 Brio
 Briton
 CISA
 Dexter by Schlage
 Falcon
 FSH
 Gainsborough
 Glynn-Johnson
 Inafer
 ISONAS
 Ives
 Kryptonite
 Legge
 LCN
 Milre
 Normbau
 QMI
 Republic Doors & Frames
 PegaSys
 Schlage
 Simons Voss Technologies
 Steelcraft
 Technical Glass Products (TGP)
 Trelock
 Von Duprin
 Yonomi (Cloud technology)
 Zero International

Allegion Ventures 
In March 2018, the company launched the venture capital fund, Allegion Ventures. The aim is to invest in early stage companies in the sectors security and smart access. The initial funding was $50 million. The following companies are part of the Allegion Ventures Programme:

 Conneqtech (GPS Tracking)
 iDevices (Smart home devices, exited 2017)
 Nuki (Smart lock)
 Mint House
 Mapped, raised $6.5M Seed II in 2021

Products and services 
Allegion manufactures and supplies electronic (including biometric) and mechanical security products to a range of end-users worldwide, including government, healthcare, hospitality, education, commercial, institutional, single and multi-family residential markets.

References

External links
 Company Homepage

Companies listed on the New York Stock Exchange
Manufacturing companies established in 2013
Corporate spin-offs
Tax inversions

Security companies